= Paola Merrill =

English YouTube personality

- Born: December 5, 1996 (age 29); Puerto Rico
- Occupations: YouTuber; author

Instagram information
- Page: Paola (Paolita) Merrill
- Followers: 250 thousand

YouTube information
- Channel: TheCottageFairy
- Years active: 2020–present
- Subscribers: 1.6 million
- Views: 100 million
- Last updated: 21 April 2026

Paola Merrill (born December 5, 1996) is an American YouTuber and author. She has over a million subscribers on her YouTube channel, TheCottageFairy. She wrote The Cottage Fairy Companion.

== Early life and education ==
Merrill grew up in Puerto Rico before moving to the southern United States. She also lived in Cuba for a few years, as well as Ireland and Italy. Her father is a former Navy captain from Washington. Her mother is a native Puerto Rican who moved to New York at the age of 22 and later joined the Navy Reserve. Paola has two siblings: Rohan Merrill, her younger brother, and Liana, her older sister. Rohan is also a YouTuber with a channel called Letters From Ro, and Liana is a martial artist.

In Dublin, Ireland, she took an English language course at the University College Dublin. She then relocated to the United States to pursue a literature degree at Western Washington University in Bellingham, Washington.

== Career ==
Merrill launched her YouTube channel, TheCottageFairy, on March 21, 2020. She has 1.57 million subscribers on her YouTube channel as of June 2025.
